Kenneth Charles McFadyen (17 January 1932 – 17 March 1998) was an Australian war artist born in Preston, Victoria in 1932. He was appointed as an official war artist for the Vietnam War. He was in Vietnam for 7 months, arriving in mid-August 1967. He was stationed with the 1st Australian Task Force base at Nui Dat, however he also worked with the 1st Australian Logistical Support Group base at Vung Tau, and the Royal Australian Navy destroyer HMAS Hobart for a short period.

After the Vietnam war, he returned to Australia and continued to paint for the Australian War Memorial. He died in March 1998 as the result of a heart attack.

In 2010, a biography of selected artworks was written by Sandra Finger Lee, titled Vietnam on Canvas.

External links and sources
 AWM site
 Vietnam on Canvas

1932 births
1998 deaths
Vietnam War artists
Australian war artists
20th-century Australian painters
20th-century male artists
Australian male painters
People from Preston, Victoria
Artists from Melbourne